Hudson Lake is a small lake in Otsego County, New York. It is located southwest of East Worcester. Hudson Lake drains west via an unnamed stream into Schenevus Creek.

References 

Lakes of New York (state)
Lakes of Otsego County, New York